Sakor Rodet (born September 3, 1967) is a judoka who competed internationally for Chad.

Rodet represented Chad at the 1992 Summer Olympics in Barcelona in the half-lightweight (60-66 kg) category, he lost in the first round to Jorge Steffano from Uruguay so did not advance any further.

References

1967 births
Living people
Chadian male judoka
Olympic judoka of Chad
Judoka at the 1992 Summer Olympics